Georgios Antzoulas (born 4 February 2000) is a Greek professional footballer who plays as a centre-back for Hungarian club Újpest.

Career

Asteras Tripolis
On 11 January 2018, Antzoulas made his professional debut in Greek Cup against Atromitos, while displaying his obvious talent in the U17 and U19 Super Leagues.

Loan to Fiorentina
On 28 July 2018, Antzoulas was loaned to Fiorentina, with a purchase option of €2 million for the summer of 2019. He has enjoyed a successful season with Fiorentina, winning the Coppa Italia Primavera and receiving a call-up to the senior squad, for three Serie A matches against Napoli in February and Milan, Parma in May. Antzoulas sat on the bench in all of those games. Interestingly, in the event Antzoulas made an appearance for the Fiorentina first team, his release clause of €2 million from Asteras Tripolis would be automatically activated.

Loan to Cosenza
On 1 February 2021, he returned to Italy on loan to Cosenza.

On 5 July 2021, Asteras Tripolis announced the extension of his contract until 2024.

References

External links

2000 births
Living people
Greek footballers
Greece under-21 international footballers
Greece youth international footballers
Super League Greece players
Asteras Tripolis F.C. players
ACF Fiorentina players
Cosenza Calcio players
Serie B players
Association football midfielders
Footballers from Tripoli, Greece
Greek expatriate footballers
Expatriate footballers in Italy
Greek expatriate sportspeople in Italy